Canadian Hockey Association may refer to:
 Canadian Hockey Association (1909–10), a men's professional ice hockey league
 Canadian Hockey Association (1968–1970), a governing body for junior ice hockey in Canada
 Hockey Canada or the Canadian Hockey Association, the governing body for ice hockey in Canada

See also
 Amateur Hockey Association of Canada (1886–1898)
 Canadian Amateur Hockey Association (1914–1994)
 Canadian Hockey League (disambiguation)